Paul Francis Trinka (January 26, 1932 – December 28, 1973) was an American film and television actor. He was known for playing Patterson in the American science fiction television series Voyage to the Bottom of the Sea.

Life and career 
Trinka was born in Blairsville, Pennsylvania to Mrs. Gabriel (Panac) Trinka and Joseph Trinka. He also had 4 sisters - Ann Coster; Mary Shaw; Mildred Strbak; Helen Curtis and 1 brother -Joseph Jr. 

He attended Blairsville Middle-High School where he graduated in 1952, and served in the United States Army in Korea. He also served in the United States Air Force. After being discharged, Trinka attended Los Angeles City College, where he studied in drama and psychology. He performed in theatre in New York and Los Angeles, California.

Trinka began his screen career in 1959, appearing in the film Operation Dames. He also guest-starred in television programs including Ben Casey, My Three Sons and Adventures in Paradise. Trinka co-starred in the science fiction television series Voyage to the Bottom of the Sea, where he played the role of the seaman Patterson. He also played Kirk in the 1965 film Faster, Pussycat! Kill! Kill!. Trinka had a fan club, which was started by young girls, called the "Paul Trinka Fan Club".  Its motto was "Don't be a Finka... Watch Paul Trinka".

Death 
Trinka died in December 1973 at the Riverside Hospital in Beverly Hills, California, at the age of 41.

References

External links 

Rotten Tomatoes profile

1932 births
1973 deaths
Male actors from Pennsylvania
American male film actors
American male television actors
20th-century American male actors
Los Angeles City College alumni